Leonardo Raul Villa (born 3 March 1985), commonly known as Leo Villa, is an Argentinian footballer.
He made his Serie B debut with FBC Unione Venezia  in the 2004-2005 season.

References

External links 
 

1985 births
Living people
Argentine footballers
Association football forwards
Serie A players
Serie B players
Venezia F.C. players
U.S. Triestina Calcio 1918 players
A.S. Cittadella players
Rovigo Calcio players
Expatriate footballers in Italy
Argentine expatriate sportspeople in Italy
S.S. Ischia Isolaverde players
Footballers from Santa Fe, Argentina